Speedcafe.com is an Australian-based motorsport news website that launched on 23 October 2009. The site had over 50 million page views in 2020.

Speedcafe.com is a source of news and race reports for the Supercars Championship, Formula One, and other categories. 

Domestic coverage includes Australian GT, SuperUtes Series, Australian Carrera Cup Championship, and TCR Australia. The site also covers international categories including MotoGP, World Rally Championship, FIA World Endurance Championship and NASCAR.

Speedcafe.com has offshoot sites with its own Classifieds and Jobstop brands. The website is also a major partner of the Australian Motor Sport Hall of Fame. In 2019 Speedcafe launched the performance motoring website Torquecafe.com 

In August 2022 it was announced founder Brett Murray had sold a majority 80% stake of the publication to a consortium made up of Karl Begg, Richard Gresham and Robert Gooley.

Contributors
The Speedcafe.com team is led by editor in chief Damien Smy and F1 editor Mat Coch.

Senior journalist Daniel Herrero, and journalists Slade Perrins and Iwan Jones round out the Speedcafe.com editorial line-up.

Former staff members include Connor O'Brien, Tom Howard, Grant Rowley, Stefan Bartholomaeus and Gordon Lomas.

Controversy
Speedcafe.com was featured in a 2012 episode of Media Watch that investigated then-owner Brett "Crusher" Murray for the conflict of interest between parent company BAM Media and his work as a columnist for the Gold Coast Bulletin.

References

External links
Home page

Australian sport websites
Australian news websites
Internet properties established in 2009
Auto racing mass media
Motorsport mass media